The Heist is a British Reality television competition series produced by Shine TV that began airing on Sky One in the UK in 2018. A first series of six episodes premiered on Nov 9, 2018. A second series of 8 episodes premiered on Feb 6, 2020. Series One is available on Amazon Prime Video in the United States.

Premise 
The programme, similar in format to Hunted (which is also produced by Shine TV), is a competition between a group of ordinary citizens (“The Thieves”) and a team of former police and intelligence officers (“The Detectives”). The Thieves are given the opportunity to “steal” money and escape. The Detectives are told only that a robbery has occurred and then use legal investigative techniques and resources (interviews with the public, access to CCTV feeds and mobile phone records of suspects, vehicle licence plate tracking, etc.) to identify the participants, track them down and recover the stolen money (or, if spent, the items purchased). A referee (Kevin O’Leary, former Scotland Yard Detective Chief Superintendent) determines if the Detectives would have realistically and legally had access to requested information; if so, it is provided or recreated by the programme.

In Series One, ten Thieves have the opportunity to take up to £250,000 (in notes and coins) from an unattended armoured car. In Series Two, nine Thieves can take up to £1 million after breaking into a bank vault. Each Thief can have an accomplice (friend or family member) drive them away from the “heist” to a location where the money taken will be equally divided (“the slaughter”). The Thieves can then hide or spend their share as they see fit (spending money may increase the risk of being located), while the Detectives attempt to identify them, recover the money and collect enough evidence to legally charge them for the theft. Suspected Thieves can be brought in for questioning, and can be arrested and held for a 24-hour period, pending being charged. Any Thief charged with sufficient evidence loses their share of the money. On the 16th day (20th day in Series 2) the remaining Thieves at large must meet at a pre-determined location to “launder” their remaining cash and escape.

Cast

Series One

The Thieves

The Detectives

Narrator 
Pip Torrens

Series Two

The Thieves 
Hellen Cole-Joyce (58) & Leonie Airlie (31)

Christine Jeffries (68) & Garry Jeffries (42)

Helen Ruff (59, former Police officer)

Micky Craig (38, ship captain) & Ryan Gray (27)

Will Bell (24) & Ishy Khatun (26)

The Detectives

Production 
The first series was filmed in and around the market town of Thirsk, in Yorkshire. The Thieves were all residents of the town or the surrounding area. The crime scene was filmed on Marage Road, adjacent to St. Mary's Church. An old library was used as the police station.

The second series was filmed in and around the town of Alnwick in Northumberland. The Duchess's Community High School served as the local police station. A storefront at 41 Fenkle Street stood in as the fictitious "Bank of Northumbria".

Episodes

Series One

External links 
 The Heist, Shine TV Page
 The Heist, IMDB Page

References

British reality television series